The Army of the Niemen was an army level command of the German Army in World War I.

Armee-Abteilung Lauenstein 
The German offensive in Courland was intended to be a diversion while the main effort was made further south by the German 11th Army and Austro-Hungarian 4th Army in the Gorlice–Tarnów Offensive.

Armee-Abteilung Lauenstein (Army Detachment Lauenstein) was formed by upgrading XXXIX Reserve Corps of 10th Army on 22 April 1915.  It was named for its commander, Generalleutnant Otto von Lauenstein, who retained simultaneous command of XXXIX Reserve Corps.  It was directly under the command of OB East.
Due to its success, it was continuously reinforced until it was raised to the status of an army as the Army of the Niemen.  Generalleutnant von Lauenstein remained as commander of XXXIX Reserve Corps.

Army of the Niemen 
The Army of the Niemen was formed on 26 May 1915 to control the troops in Courland.  The former commander of the 8th Army, General der Infanterie Otto von Below, along with his chief of staff, Generalmajor von Böckmann, assumed command.  The Army of the Niemen took part in the successful German Riga–Schaulen offensive.

In the meantime, the 8th Army got a deputy commander, General der Artillerie Friedrich von Scholtz, who was simultaneously commander of XX Corps. 8th Army was dissolved on 29 September 1915.

On 30 December 1915 the Army of the Niemen was renamed as the 8th Army with von Below still in command.

Glossary 
Armee-Abteilung or Army Detachment in the sense of "something detached from an Army".  It is not under the command of an Army so is in itself a small Army.
Armee-Gruppe or Army Group in the sense of a group within an Army and under its command, generally formed as a temporary measure for a specific task.
Heeresgruppe or Army Group in the sense of a number of armies under a single commander.

See also 

XXXIX Reserve Corps
8th Army (German Empire)
Great Retreat (Russian)

References

Bibliography 
 
 

N
Military units and formations established in 1915
Military units and formations disestablished in 1915

de:8. Armee (Deutsches Kaiserreich)
hr:Armija Njemen
pl:8 Armia (Cesarstwo Niemieckie)
ru:8-я армия (Германская империя)